Book Two: Earth is the second season of Avatar: The Last Airbender, an American animated television series created and produced by Michael Dante DiMartino and Bryan Konietzko for Nickelodeon. The series starred Zach Tyler Eisen, Mae Whitman, Jack DeSena, Jessie Flower, Dante Basco, Dee Bradley Baker, Mako Iwamatsu (in his final performance as Iroh) and Grey DeLisle as the main character voices.

In the second season, Aang and his friends Katara and Sokka are on a quest to find an Earthbending teacher which finishes when they recruit Toph Beifong. After finding important information concerning the war with the Fire Nation, Appa ends up kidnapped. Their journey leads to Ba Sing Se, the capital of the Earth Kingdom, where they uncover a great internal government conspiracy. Meanwhile, due to their actions at the North Pole in Book One, Zuko and Iroh are declared traitors of the Fire Nation and desert their country, becoming fugitives in the Earth Kingdom. Pursuing both Zuko and Aang is Princess Azula, Zuko's younger prodigy sister.

Book Two: Earth premiered on Nickelodeon on March 17, 2006. It consisted of 20 episodes and concluded on December 1, 2006. The season received considerable acclaim, with the series being called "consistently excellent." The series won multiple awards, including Best Character Animation in a Television Production from the 34th Annie Awards and Outstanding Individual Achievement in Animation at the 2007 Emmy Awards.

Between January 23, 2007, and September 11, 2007, Paramount Home Entertainment released four DVD sets containing five episodes each before releasing the entire season as a boxset.


Episodes

Production
The season was produced by Nickelodeon Animation Studio and aired on Nickelodeon, both of which are owned by Viacom. The season's executive producers and co-creators are Michael Dante DiMartino and Bryan Konietzko, who worked alongside head writer and co-producer Aaron Ehasz. Most of the individual episodes were directed by Ethan Spaulding, Lauren MacMullan and Giancarlo Volpe. Episodes were written by a team of writers, which consisted of Aaron Ehasz, Elizabeth Welch, Tim Hedrick, John O'Bryan; along with creators DiMartino and Konietzko.

The season's music was composed by "The Track Team", which consists of Jeremy Zuckerman and Benjamin Wynn, who were known to the show's creators because Zuckerman was Konietzko's roommate.

Cast
Most of the main characters from the first season remained the same: Zach Tyler Eisen voices Aang, Mae Whitman voices Katara, Jack DeSena voices Sokka, Dee Bradley Baker voices both Appa and Momo, and Dante Basco voices Zuko.

In addition, several new characters appear: Jessie Flower voices Toph Beifong, Grey DeLisle voices Azula, Cricket Leigh voices Mai, Olivia Hack voices Ty Lee, and Clancy Brown voices Long Feng.

Mako Iwamatsu, who voiced Iroh in the first two seasons, died from throat cancer after production was completed; he was replaced by Greg Baldwin for the following season and The Legend of Korra.

In the episode "The Tales of Ba Sing Se", the segment titled "The Tale of Iroh" features a dedication to Mako at the end when Iroh is tearfully singing to mourn the loss of his only child, Lu Ten.

Reception
In a review of the Volume 2 DVD Release for Book 2, Gabriel Powers from DVDActive.com described the series as one of the best children's series in recent times, making comparisons with Samurai Jack and Justice League, and complimented it for its depth and humour. Powers also comments:

For the video and audio quality, Powers says "Season two generally looks better than the bulk of season one, but still has some issues" concerning image sharpness. Rotten Tomatoes gave it an 87% fresh rating in 2008. Jamie S. Rich from DVD Talk says that "As a flat concept, Avatar the Last Airbender is nothing special, but in execution, it is head and shoulders above other children's entertainment", and that "as a whole, the look of Avatar is consistently excellent".

The show also received acclaim for its visual appeal. In the 34th Annie Awards, the show was nominated for and won the "Best Character Animation in a Television Production" award, for Jae-Myung Yu's animation in "The Blind Bandit", and the "Best Directing in an Animated Television Production" award, for the episode "The Drill". In 2007, the show was nominated for "Outstanding Animated Program" in the 2007 Emmy Awards for the "City of Walls and Secrets" episode, though it did not win. However, the show did win the "Outstanding Individual Achievement in Animation" award for Sang-Jin Kim's animation in the "Lake Laogai" episode.

Home media
Nickelodeon began releasing DVDs for Book 2 on January 23, 2007.  The first four DVD releases contain one disc that consisted of five episodes each. The final DVD was the "Complete Book 2 Box Set", which contains all of the episodes in the season on four discs, and packaged with a special features disc. All of the DVD sets for Book 2 were released with Region 1 encoding, meaning that they can only play on North American DVD players.  Book 2 was released on Region 2 on July 20, 2009.

Footnotes
1. Production code format taken from the commentary for "Sozin's Comet: The Phoenix King"

References
General
 
 

Specific

Avatar: The Last Airbender
2006 American television seasons

fr:Liste des épisodes d'Avatar, le dernier maître de l'air#Livre Deux : La Terre